The DeLano Award for Computational Biosciences is a prize in the field of computational biology. It is awarded annually for "the most accessible and innovative development or application of computer technology to enhance research in the life sciences at the molecular level".

The prize was established by the American Society for Biochemistry and Molecular Biology (ASBMB) in memory of Warren Lyford DeLano, an American bioinformatician. DeLano developed the PyMOL open source molecular viewer software and was an advocate for the increased adoption of open source practices in the sciences. DeLano died unexpectedly in 2009.

Laureates include the Nobel Prize winner Michael Levitt, who was given the Delano Award in 2013 for his work in computational bioscience.

Laureates
2023 - Eytan Ruppin
2022 - Tatyana Sharpee
2020 - Yang Zhang
2019 - Brian Kuhlman
2018 - Chris Sander
2017 - Brian K. Shoichet
2016 - Todd O. Yeates
2015 - Vijay S. Pande
2014 - Michael Levitt
2013 - Helen M. Berman
2012 - Barry Honig
2011 - Axel T. Brunger

See also

 List of biology awards
 List of awards in bioinformatics and computational biology

References

Bioinformatics
Biology awards